Van de Sande (also "van den" and "van der Sande") is a Dutch toponymic surname meaning "from the sand" (Modern Dutch van het zand). The name could for example have originated from any of the settlements in the Low Countries named 't Zand. People with the surname include:

 (1863–1910), Dutch physician and explorer of New Guinea
Johan van den Sande (1568–1638), Dutch historian and prominent writer of the common law of Friesland
Jort van der Sande (born 1996), Dutch football forward
 (1887–1954), Dutch bass-baritone singer
Roel van de Sande (born 1987), Dutch football midfielder
Theo van de Sande (born 1947), Dutch cinematographer
Tosh Van der Sande (born 1990), Belgian racing cyclist
Van de Sande Bakhuyzen, Dutch patrician family

See also
Van der Zande, Dutch surname with the same meaning
Francisco de Sande (1540–1602), 3rd Spanish governor of the Philippines

References

Dutch-language surnames
Dutch toponymic surnames